The Australia physical disability national rugby league team represent Australia in international physical disability rugby league competitions throughout Asia-Pacific and the World. At the 2018 Rugby League Commonwealth Championship the team won the Physical Disability tournament based on their group results. They drew in the final against New Zealand. In September 2018 a squad was named to take part in a best of three series against New Zealand as part of the 2018 Emerging Nations World Championship in Sydney.

In October 2022 the team competed at the 2021 Physical Disability Rugby League World Cup where they came fourth in the tournament.

Current squad
Squad for 2021 PDRL World Cup:

 Kane Ridgley (Gold Coast Titans)
 Jonathan Smith (South Sydney Rabbitohs)
 Bryce Crane (Sydney Roosters)
 Karel Dekker (Gold Coast Titans)
 Kyle Lloyd (Newtown Jets)
 Dean Clark (Gold Coast Titans)
 Hudson Wicks (Gold Coast Titans)
 Stephen Hendry (Gold Coast Titans)
 Harry Rodgers (Gold Coast Titans)
 Adam Hills (Warrington Wolves)
 Dylan Jobson (Gold Coast Titans)
 Richard Muff (Gold Coast Titans)
 Peter Mitchell (South Sydney Rabbitohs)
 George Tonna (South Sydney Rabbitohs)
 Edward Sharp (Newtown Jets)
 Rylan Gaudron (South Sydney Rabbitohs)
 Geoff Clarke (South Sydney Rabbitohs)
 Fady Taiba (Wests Tigers)
 Rylee Lowe (Sydney Roosters)
 Michael Baker (Gold Coast Titans)

source:

Results

References

Physical Disability international rugby league teams
Disability in Australia